Events of 2018 in Somaliland.

Incumbents
President: Muse Bihi Abdi
Vice President: Abdirahman Saylici
Speaker of the House: Bashe Mohamed Farah
Chairman of the House: Suleiman Mohamoud Adan
 Chief Justice: Adan Haji Ali
 Chief of Staff of Armed Forces: Nuh Ismail Tani

Events

January
January 4
President Muse Bihi Abdi appointed six official posts, including three Director Generals, two Managers and the Auditor General.
January 8
Somaliland Armed Forces take control of the town of Tukaraq in Sool region from Puntland forces.

February
February 17
The Somaliland Marathon is held in Hargeisa for the first time, with 205 athletes, both local runners international ones participated the event.

March
March 25
President Bihi delivered his first State of the Nation address to a joint session of Parliament of Somaliland.

April
April 15
President of Somaliland announced that has marked the Tree Planting Day of the nation on 15 April by presidential decree.

May
May 23
The Somaliland government has taken over the control of the Berbera Petroleum Laboratory, after improper fuel flow through BPL resulted in the leakage of fossil fuels into berbera fuel tanks, causing contamination of used vehicles and no pure petrol across the country.

June
June 2
One person was killed and twenty-one houses were collapsed after heavy rains and winds made a landfall at Awbarkhadle and Carobaydhe areas in the east of Hargeisa.

July
July 20-25
The 12th installment of the annual Hargeisa International Book Fair held in hargeisa, with the theme of coexistence and guest country of Egypt.

August
August 23
Five people have been killed, including a student girl, and several others injured after being attacked by hyenas in Aynabo District of Saraar region.

September
September 1
The Minister of Public Works has announced a campaign on public property statistics to be divided into buildings such as schools and hospitals & open land.

October
October 25
President of Somaliland has declared that 17 October which previously celebrated as the SNM Martyrs Day turned to the Somaliland National Heroes Day.

November
November 12
the National Tender Board has announced the successful bid for the implementation of three projects which was the Alamzey Stadium, University of Hargeisa and Ministry of Finance.

December
December 20
The General Auditor submits the national accounting of 2017 for Sub-committee of  Monitoring and Protection of National Properties of the House of Representatives.

Deaths

April
April 4 
 Sahra Ahmed Jama - Veteran singer.

May
May 9 
 Ali Ibrahim Mohamed - politician.

References

 
2010s in Somaliland
Somaliland
Somaliland